Monzón: A Knockout Blow (Monzón) is 2019 Spanish-language TV series starring Carla Quevedo, Mariano Chiesa and Paloma Ker.

Cast 
 Carla Quevedo as Alicia Muñiz
 Mariano Chiesa as Tito Lectoure
 Paloma Ker as Pelusa
 Belén Chavanne as Leticia
 Rodrigo Pedreira as Vargas Rissi
 Cumelen Sanz as Silvia Monzón
 Fabián Arenillas as Amílcar Brusa
 Nacho Gadano as El Turco
 Lautaro Delgado as Nicolino
 Andres Gil as Nino
 Yayo Guridi as El Flaco Herminda
 Pedro Merlo as Bocha
 Alexia Moyano as Luz
 Jean Pierre Noher as Gordo Caño
 Martín Seefeld as El Negro
 Pablo Sorensen as Gordillo
 Diego Starosta as Gentile
 Mex Urtizberea as Pichon
 Atilio Veronelli as Zorro

Release
Monzón: A Knockout Blow was released on June 17, 2019.

References

External links
 
 

2010s Argentine drama television series
2019 Argentine television series debuts
2019 Argentine television series endings
Spanish-language Netflix original programming
Television series by Disney